The School for Advanced Studies in the Social Sciences (EHESS) is a graduate grande école and grand établissement in Paris focused on academic research in the social sciences. It is regarded as one of the most prestigious institutions of higher learning in France. The school awards Master and PhD degrees alone and conjointly with the grandes écoles École Normale Supérieure, École Polytechnique, and École pratique des hautes études.

Originally a department of the École pratique des hautes études, created in 1868 with the purpose of training academic researchers, the EHESS became an independent institution in 1975. Today its research covers social sciences, humanities, and applied mathematics. Degrees and research in economics and finance are awarded through the Paris School of Economics. 

The EHESS, in common with other grandes écoles, is a small school with very strict entry criteria, and admits students through a rigorous selection process based on applicants' research projects. Scholars in training are subsequently free to choose their own curriculum amongst the School's fields of research. The école has a small student-faculty ratio; 830 researchers for 3,000 students (27.6%). 

Most of the School's faculty belong to other institutions, mostly within the French National Centre for Scientific Research and schools affiliated with PSL University. The School is notable for its work connected to amongst others sociologist Pierre Bourdieu, philosopher Jacques Derrida, as well as economist Thomas Piketty.

History

École pratique des hautes études
Originally part of the École pratique des hautes études (EPHE) as its VI Section: Sciences économiques et sociales, the EHESS gained autonomy as an independent higher education institution on 23 January 1975. The creation of a dedicated branch for social science research within the EPHE was catalyzed by the Annales historical school and was supported by several academic initiatives of the Rockefeller Foundation, dating to the 1920s. After WWII, the Rockefeller Foundation invested more funds in French institutions, seeking to encourage non-Marxist sociological studies.

The VIth section was created in 1947, and Lucien Febvre took its head. Soon after its creation (1947), the VI Section, later EHESS, became one of the most influential shapers of contemporary historiography, area studies and social sciences methodology, thanks to the contribution of eminent scholars such as Fernand Braudel, Jacques Le Goff and François Furet. F. Braudel succeeded L. Febvre in 1956. He concentrated the various study groups at the well-known building on boulevard Raspail (area of allée Claude-Cahun-Marcel-Moore), in part by financing from the Ford Foundation.

Independent institution
Today, the EHESS is one of France's Grands établissements. It functions as a research, teaching, and degree-granting institution. It offers advanced students high-level programs intended to lead to research careers. Students are admitted on the relevance of their research project and undertake at the EHESS master programs and doctoral studies. The main areas of specialization include: history, literary theory, linguistics, philosophy, philology, sociology, anthropology, economics, cognitive science, demographics, geography, archaeology, psychology, law, and mathematics. The institution's focus is on interdisciplinary research within these fields. The EHESS has more than 40 research centers (among which are several joint research units with the CNRS) and 22 doctoral programs, 13 of which are in partnership with other French Universities and Grandes écoles.

PSL Research University
The school is a constituent college of the federal PSL Research University. Other institutions include the College de France, the École Normale Supérieure, the École pratique des hautes études, Chimie ParisTech, ESPCI ParisTech, the École des mines, and Paris Dauphine University.

Research

History

Influence from the Annales School
Lucien Febvre and Fernand Braudel were members of the École des Annales, the dominant school of historical analysis in France during the interwar period. However, this school of thought was contested by the growing importance of the social sciences and the beginning of structuralism. Under pressure from Claude Lévi-Strauss, in particular, they integrated new contributions from the fields of sociology and ethnography to event-based historical analysis, a concept put forward by the Annales school, to advocate for the concept of "a nearly imperceptible passage of history". They were reproached, along with the structuralists, for ignoring politics and the individual's influence over his fate during a period in which the colonial wars of liberation were taking place.

The work of Braudel, Le Roy Ladurie and other historians working under their influence greatly affected the research and official teaching of history in France beginning in the 1960s. The work of Jean-Marie Pesez renewed interest in the issue of methodology in medieval archeology and created the idea of "material culture". François Hartog, who serves as the director of the school's ancient and modern historiography department, is also noted for proposing that the problems of modern time schema are not entirely caused by an imperialist past. He is also known for challenging the Eurocentric reflection of history and the present.

New History
During the 1970s, EHESS became the center of New History under the influence of Jacques Le Goff and Pierre Nora. During this period, a generation of ethnologists working under the ideas of Georges Balandier and Marc Augé were critical of the French colonial tradition and applied modern sociological concepts to third world countries.

New Polish School of Holocaust Scholarship 
In 2019, held the New Polish School of Holocaust Scholarship conference. The conference was disrupted by Polish nationalists. EHESS President, Christophe Prochasson, said he could not recall such a violent disturbance at any scientific conference. Minister Frédérique Vidal condemned Polish authorities.

Sociology
Pierre Bourdieu, Luc Boltanski, Alain Touraine, Jean-Claude Passeron have all been associated with EHESS.

Economics
EHESS has always been a central place for economic debate in Europe. In France this debate is also enabled by the proximity of the researchers in Paris with national economic institutions: In this sense EHESS's advisors who have been drawn from economic professors have enjoyed a large media audience (one notable example was Jean Fourastié). The diversity of viewpoints has been a priority, and liberal and Marxist economists have had the chance to debate in EHESS. Since the 1970s and 1980s EHESS has focused on quantitative economics, with classes led by well-known professors such as Louis-André Gérard-Varet, Jean-Jacques Laffont, François Bourguignon and Roger Guesnerie. They initiated not only the Paris School of Economics but the Toulouse School of Economics and Grequam (Aix-Marseille).

Organisation

Recruitment
More than 50% of the student body comes from countries other than France.

Domestic and foreign networks

Affiliations
The school is a founding member of the Paris School of Economics, Toulouse School of Economics, and Aix-Marseille School of Economics, the three French leading centers in Quantitative Economics. Since 2014 it is an associated member of the Paris Research University (PSL).

International partnerships
EHESS has exchange programs with universities such as Oxford and Cambridge in the United Kingdom; Columbia, Yale, University of California, and Michigan State in the United States; Heidelberg in Germany; Tokyo and Kyoto in Japan; Peking in China; the European University Institute in Florence, etc. Also, it has many relations and exchange programs with universities in Asia and the Middle-East; it holds research centers on Asian Studies and Islamic Studies.

Notable alumni

 Manola Antonioli
 Roberto Beneduce
 Nicole Brenez
 Françoise Briand
 Manuel Carvalheiro
 Antonio Casilli
 Arachu Castro
 Yves Censi
 Philippe Corcuff
 Julien Coupat
 Louis Chauvel
 Louis Dumont
 Pascal Chaigneau
 Jacques Dassié
 Robert Delort
 Božidar Đelić
 Aïssa Dermouche
 Albert Doja
 Esther Duflo
 Serge Dufoulon
 Moisés Espírito Santo
 Safi Faye
 Caroline Fourest
 Dario Gamboni
 Susan George
 Nathalie Heinich
 Béatrice Hibou
 Jean Hyppolite
 Bruno Jaffré
 Christian Geffray
 Michel Lauwers
 Marc Lazar
 José Manuel López López
 Frédéric Lordon
 Édouard Louis
 Caterina Magni
 Sabrina Malek
 Alain Marleix
 Frédéric Martel
 Walter Mignolo
 Laure Murat
 Sébastien Nadot
 Guadalupe Nettel
 Christine Niederberger Betton
 Laurent Nunez
 Hector Obalk
 Thomas Pavel
 Thomas Piketty
 Guy Poitevin
 Ignacio Ramonet
 Joseph Gaï Ramaka
 Bernard Salanié
 Cheick Oumar Sissoko
 Bernard Stiegler
 Jean-Louis Swiners
 David Thesmar
 Alain Touraine
 Laurent Turcot
 Frédéric Vandenberghe
 Olivier Weber

Notable faculty
Past and present faculty (including EPHE's VI Section):

 
 Sylviane Agacinski
 Marc Augé
 Roland Barthes
 Claude Berge
 Augustin Berque
 Pierre Bourdieu
 François Bourguignon
 
 Fernand Braudel
 Claude Calame
 Fernando Henrique Cardoso
 Manuel Castells
 Cornelius Castoriadis
 Roger Chartier
 Annie Cohen-Solal
 Jacques Derrida
 Philippe Descola
 Oswald Ducrot
 Louis Dumont
 Nicolas Ellison
 
 Lucien Febvre
 Marc Ferro
 David Feuerwerker
 Maribel Fierro
 François Furet
 Marcel Gauchet
 Maurice Godelier
 Nilüfer Göle
 Algirdas Julien Greimas
 Roger Guesnerie
 Pierre Hadot
 Bernard Harcourt
 Stanley Hoffmann
 Olivier Jeanne
 
 Milan Kundera
 Jacques Lacan
 Marie-Claire Lavabre
 Jacques Le Goff
 Emmanuel Le Roy Ladurie
 Claude Lefort
 Pierre Manent
 Jacques Mehler
 Christian Metz
 Edgar Morin
 Thomas Piketty
 Richard Portes
 Ignacio Ramonet
 Pierre Rosenstiehl
 Emma Rothschild
 Olivier Roy
 
 Jean-Claude Schmitt
 Carlo Severi
 
 Sanjay Subrahmanyam
 Jean Tirole
 
 Alain Touraine
 Alessandro Triulzi
 Jean-Pierre Vernant
 Georges Vigarello
 Arundhati Virmani
 Eduardo Viveiros de Castro
 
 
 Michel Wieviorka

See also 
 École libre des hautes études
 The New School for Social Research
 Paris Universitas
 :Category:School for Advanced Studies in the Social Sciences alumni
 :Category:Academic staff of the School for Advanced Studies in the Social Sciences

References

External links

 L'École des Hautes Études en Sciences Sociales - official site
  EHESS's history
  List of EHESS research centers

Grands établissements
Education in Paris
Educational institutions established in 1975
6th arrondissement of Paris
Social science institutes
Research institutes in France
1975 establishments in France
Universities in Paris
Grandes écoles